Corinne Bouchoux, (born 5 January 1964 in Issy-les-Moulineaux) is a French historian and politician.

She is a Member of Europe Ecology – The Greens (EELV), she was Senator from Maine-et-Loire from 2011 to 2017.

Life 
Corinne Bouchoux graduated from the Sciences Po in 1986.

Between 1997 and 2007, she was management staff for National Education.

In September 2007, she became, a research engineer responsible for the direction of training and student life at Agrocampus Ouest, center of Angers,  She left the school on October 1, 2011 following her election as a senator.

She defended a doctoral thesis in history on the subject: “If paintings could speak. The political and media treatment of the returns of works of art looted and despoiled by the Nazis (France 1945-2008)”. She became involved, as a senator, in the restitution of works of art looted during the Third Reich, so that the history of the works of art in deposit was clarified, that their inventory was drawn up and that these archives are available online.

As a historian, she collaborated with Musea, a virtual museum of women's and gender history, published by the University of Angers, for which she has designed four exhibitions: "La citoyenne Marie Bonnevial (1841-1918)", "Rose Valland , on the art front”, “Family Planning: 50 years in posters” (with Bibia Pavard), exhibition dedicated to the French Movement for Family Planning and an exhibition on Yvette Roudy in posters and photos. She worked mainly on: the attractiveness of territories, economic intelligence and its teaching in France for 20 years, the transformation of our production methods and the impact on the skills of actors and territories, with the dimension of gender.  

In September 2011, she was elected Senator for Maine-et-Loire under the Greens banner. She was a member of the Committee on Culture, Education and Communication and Secretary of the Senate Committee for the control of the application of laws. She was on a commission on the  recognition and compensation of victims. of French nuclear tests. The report, n°856 (2012-2013)6, filed on September 18, 2013, entitled: "Compensation for victims of French nuclear tests: a law that has not yet achieved its objectives", recalled the content of the Morin law and drew up an inventory of its formal and practical application, which, according to the rapporteurs, “turns out to be well below initial expectations”. To remedy this situation, the two rapporteurs formulated a set of recommendations so that the law of 2010 was effective.

She chaired the environmental group in the Senate from November to December 2015, in tandem with Jean-Vincent Placé, then from February 2016, following his entry into government. She left this function on May 3, 2016, becoming secretary of the Senate office, in place of Jean Desessard.

In 2019, she joined the list of the outgoing mayor of Angers, Christophe Béchu, who has the support of La République en Marche13 for the municipal elections of 2020. She is 5th vice-president in charge of ecological transition and travel, on the community council of Angers Loire Métropole.

She has been in a civil partnership since 2001 with the historian Christine Bard. She considers claiming sexuality as a militant act, especially vis-à-vis young people, who “do not have enough positive representations of sexuality. It's important for them to be able to tell themselves that we can be gay and manage to do politics”.

In parallel with her elected function, she works as a teacher of social and economic sciences (SES) at the Auguste-et-Jean-Renoir high school in Angers.

References 

1964 births
French politicians
Living people
People from Issy-les-Moulineaux
Sciences Po alumni